The Battle of Zasław was a battle that took place near the village of Iziaslav, on 24 January 1491, during the Polish–Ottoman War. It was fought by the armies of the Crown of the Kingdom of Poland led by Mikołaj Chodecki, and the Grand Duchy of Lithuania, led by Semyon Olshanski, against the forces of the Crimean Khanate. It was won by the Polish and Lithuanian side.

The battle 
The battle that took place by the Horyn river, near the village of Iziaslav, on 24 January 1491, during the Polish–Ottoman War. It was fought by the armies of the Crown of the Kingdom of Poland led by Mikołaj Chodecki, and the Grand Duchy of Lithuania, led by Semyon Olshanski, against the forces of the Crimean Khanate. The Crimean forces counted 9000 soldiers. The battle ended with Polish and Lithuanian, with Creaminean forces being destroyed, with only around 50 soldiers surviving.

Citations

Notes

References 

Zaslaw, 1491, battle
Zaslaw, 1491, battle
Zaslaw, 1491, battle
Zaslaw, 1491, battle
Zaslaw, battle
15th century in Europe
15th century in Poland
15th century in Ukraine